NGC 6565, also known as ESO 456-70, is a planetary nebula 14,000 light-years away, formed when a star ejected its outer layers during the late stages of its evolution. It is about 13th magnitude and has a diameter of 8 to 10 arcseconds.

See also
 Ring Nebula (which has undergone a similar process and is a larger nebula of the same type)
 List of NGC objects
 Planetary nebulae

References

 Robert Burnham, Jr, Burnham's Celestial Handbook: An observer's guide to the universe beyond the solar system, vol 3, p. 1556

External links
 

Planetary nebulae
6565
Sagittarius (constellation)